My Australian Story is a series of historical novels for older children  published by Scholastic Australia which was inspired by Dear America. Each book is written in the form of a fictional diary of a young person living during an important event or time period in Australian history.

Series
On Board the Boussole: The Diary of Julienne Fulbert, Laperouse's Voyage of Discovery, 1785-1788 by Christine Edwards (2002)
Surviving Sydney Cove: The Convict Diary of Elizabeth Harvey, Sydney, 1790 by Goldie Alexander (2000)
The Rum Rebellion: The Diary of David Bellamy, Sydney Town, 1807-1808 by Libby Gleeson (2001)
A Banner Bold: The Diary of Rosa Aarons, Ballarat Goldfield, 1854 by Nadia Wheatley (2000)
Archer's Melbourne Cup: The Diary of Robby Jenkins, Terara, New South Wales, 1860-1861 by Vashti Farrer (2007)
New Gold Mountain: The Diary of Shu Cheong, Lambing Flat, New South Wales, 1860-1861 by Christopher W. Cheng (2005)
Riding with Thunderbolt: The Diary of Ben Cross Northern NSW, 1865 by Allan Baillie (2004)
The Yankee Whaler: The Diary of Thomas Morris, Bunbury, Western Australia, 1876 by Deborah Lisson (2001)
Claw of the Dragon: The Diary of Billy Shanghai Hamilton, Broome, Western Australia, 1899-1900 by Patricia Bernard (2008)
Plagues and Federation: The Diary of Kitty Barnes, The Rocks Sydney - 1900 by Vashti Farrer (2000)
The Melting Pot: The Diary of Edward, Chek Chee, Sydney, 1903-1904 by Christopher W. Cheng (2007)
Our Enemy, My Friend: The Diary of Emma Sheldrake, Adelaide Hills, 1915 by Jenny Blackman (2005)
A Different Sort of Real: The Diary of Charlotte McKenzie, Melbourne, 1919 - 1919 by Kerry Greenwood (2001), also titled The Deadly Flu as printed in 2012, and Contagion: My Australian Story, Scholastic Australia, 2020.
Fords and Flying Machines: The Diary of Jack McLaren, Longreach, 1919-1921 by Patricia Bernard (2003)
Outback: The Diary of Jimmy Porter, Central Australia, 1927-1928 by Christine Harris (2005), 
Our Don Bradman: The Diary of Victor McDonald, Sydney, 1932 by Peter Allen (2004)
Who am I? The Diary of Mary Talence, Sydney, 1937 by Anita Heiss (2001)
The Bombing of Darwin: The Diary of Tom Taylor, Darwin, 1942 by Alan Tucker (2002)
My Story: Journey to Tangiwai, The Diary of Peter Cotterill, Napier 1953 by David Hill (2003)
Atomic Testing: The Diary of Anthony Brown, Woomera, 1953 by Alan Tucker (2009) 
A Marathon of Her Own: The Diary of Sophia Krikonis, Melbourne, 1956 by Irini Savvides (2004)
Snowy: The Diary of Eva Fischer, Cabramurra, 1958-1959 by Siobhan McHugh (2003)
A Tale of Two Families: The Diary of Jan Packard, Melbourne, 1974 by Jenny Pausacker (2000)
Cyclone Tracy: The Diary of Ryan Turner, Darwin, 1974 by Alan Tucker (2006)
Refugee: The Diary of Ali Ismail, Woomera, 2001-2002 by Alan Sunderland (2006)
The Hunt for Ned Kelly by Sophie Masson (2010)
The Phar Lap Mystery by Sophie Masson (2010)
My Father's War by Sophie Masson (2011)
The Melting Pot by Christopher Cheng (2011)
Secrets and Sisterhood by Jenny Pausacker (2012)
The Rum Rebellion by Libby Gleeson (2012)
Snatched by Pirates by Patricia Barnard (2012)
The Deadly Flu by Kerry Greenwood (2012)
Voyage to Botany Bay by Chrissie Michaels (2012)
Sydney Harbour Bridge by Vashti Farrer (2012)
Heroes of Tobruk by David Mulligan (2012)
Escape from Cockatoo Island by Yvette Poshoglian (2013)
Gallipoli by Alan Tucker (2013)
Fremantle Prison Break by Deborah Lisson (2013)
Kokoda by Alan Tucker (2014)
Convict Girl by Chrissie Michaels (2014)
Black Sunday: Australia's Biggest Beach Rescue by Evan McHugh (2016)

See also
Dear America
Dear Canada
I Am Canada
My Story

References

External links
Scholastic Australia's My Australian Story
Good Reads
Wheeler's Books

Series of children's books
Young adult novel series
Children's historical novels
Australian historical novels
Australian children's novels
Fictional diaries